Marion Township is an inactive township in Jasper County, in the U.S. state of Missouri.

Marion Township has the name of Francis Marion, an army officer during the American Revolutionary War.

References

Townships in Missouri
Townships in Jasper County, Missouri